Christopher Mason Savino (born October 2, 1971) is an American writer, comic book artist, and former animator. He is well-known as the creator of the animated series The Loud House. Savino has also worked on The Ren & Stimpy Show, Dexter's Laboratory, Cow and Chicken, I Am Weasel, The Powerpuff Girls,  Samurai Jack, My Gym Partner's a Monkey, Kick Buttowski: Suburban Daredevil, My Little Pony: Friendship Is Magic,  Mickey Mouse and Johnny Test.

Savino has been nominated for three Primetime Emmy Awards, two Annie Awards, and a Daytime Emmy Award.

Early life
Savino was born and raised in Royal Oak, Michigan, where he attended Dondero High School. He is the ninth of ten children, having five sisters and four brothers. His biggest influence in the animation world was Mighty Mouse: The New Adventures because of the way its animation style differed from that of the other 1980s animated series.

Career
He began his career in the animation industry in 1991 and has worked for Spümcø, Joe Murray Studio, Nickelodeon Animation Studios, Hanna-Barbera, Cartoon Network Studios and Disney Television Animation. He was originally the showrunner for the last two seasons of Dexter's Laboratory, The Powerpuff Girls, and My Gym Partner's a Monkey. He was also previously a writer for The Grim Adventures of Billy & Mandy, Kick Buttowski: Suburban Daredevil, and Mickey Mouse. In June 2014, his short for Nickelodeon, The Loud House, was greenlit for a full series, and debuted on May 2, 2016.

On November 1, 2019, Savino released his debut children's novel, Coal: A Cautionary Christmas Tale, through Amazon Publishing. Later on December of the same year he published the first installment of his graphic novel duology Bigfoot & Gray.

On March 3, 2020, he published his first non-fiction book, a guide to write cartoons entitled Writing Cartoons in 4 Acts (Or How I Learned to Stop Worrying and Love the Midpoint).

Since January 5, 2020, he also publishes the Sunday strip For Brothers.

Personal life
Sexual harassment allegations

On October 17, 2017, Cartoon Brew reported that Nickelodeon had suspended Savino from their studio due to multiple allegations of sexual harassment against him; rumors of Savino's inappropriate behavior had existed for "at least a decade". As many as a dozen women accused Savino of sexual harassment, unwanted sexual advances, and threats of blacklisting female colleagues who no longer agreed to consensual relationships with him. On October 19, a Nickelodeon spokesperson confirmed that they fired Savino, and that The Loud House would continue production without him. On October 23, Savino spoke for the first time since the allegations first appeared, saying he was "deeply sorry" for his actions. On May 30, 2018, Savino was given a one-year suspension from The Animation Guild, IATSE Local 839. As part of his plea bargain with The Animation Guild, Savino was ordered to donate $4,000 to a charity chosen by the guild, complete 40 hours of community service, undergo counseling, and obtain a certificate of sexual harassment training.

The allegations and his union suspension process were featured in a March 2019 segment on Full Frontal with Samantha Bee'' titled #Metoon that was produced and animated by a crew of all women, and featured interviews with a few of the female animators that were involved in his successful union suspension campaign along with one of his alleged victims.

In a September 2019 interview, Savino mentioned his regret about his actions.

In October 2019, Savino claimed to be a born-again Christian.

Filmography

Television

Film

Internet

Awards and nominations

References

External links
 
 Official website for Savino's Sunday strip For Brothers
 

1971 births
Living people
American writers of Italian descent
American cartoonists
American television directors
American television writers
American male screenwriters
American Christians
American male television writers
American storyboard artists
Hanna-Barbera people
Cartoon Network Studios people
People from Royal Oak, Michigan
Nickelodeon Animation Studio people
Screenwriters from Michigan
Showrunners
20th-century American screenwriters
20th-century American male writers
21st-century American screenwriters
21st-century American male writers
Animators from Michigan
Television producers from Michigan
American animators
Animation directors